Jeong Yeon-jin (born 2 February 1990), better known as Jin Jeong, is a South Korean professional golfer.

Jeong was born in Busan and moved to Melbourne, Australia in 2006. He has enjoyed a highly successful amateur career. In 2010 he had two spells as the number one ranked amateur golfer on the back of four wins including The Amateur Championship, the first Asian to win that championship, and finishing as low amateur in a tie for 14th place in The Open Championship.

Jeong turned professional in April 2011. In December 2011, he finished 16th in the PGA Tour of Australasia qualifying school, winning a place on tour for 2012.

In 2012, Jeong played in all three stages of the European Tour qualifying school, obtaining a place in some Challenge Tour events for 2013.  In early October 2013, he competed in the first stage of the qualifying schools for the European Tour (successfully) and the Web.com Tour (unsuccessfully).

Jeong won his first championship as a professional on 20 October 2013, winning the ISPS Handa Perth International on the European Tour in a playoff over Ross Fisher.  He was one of three players who had earned a place in that tournament from his position in the PGA Tour of Australasia's Tier 2 Money List for 2012, finishing 55th in the 2012 Order of Merit. This win gave him an exemption on the European Tour until the end of 2015.

Amateur wins
2008 Port Phillip Amateur, Victorian Junior Masters
2010 The Amateur Championship, Riversdale Cup, Boroondara Cup

Professional wins (2)

European Tour wins (1)

1Co-sanctioned by the PGA Tour of Australasia

European Tour playoff record (1–0)

PGA Tour of Australasia wins (1)

1Co-sanctioned by the European Tour

PGA Tour of Australasia playoff record (1–0)

Other wins (1)
2010 Tasmanian Open (as an amateur)

Results in major championships

LA = Low amateur
CUT = missed the half-way cut
"T" = tied

Results in World Golf Championships

"T" = Tied

References

External links

Jin Jeong at the Sportyard website

South Korean male golfers
PGA Tour of Australasia golfers
European Tour golfers
Golfers from Melbourne
Sportspeople from Busan
1990 births
Living people